Helle Thomsen (born 30 November 1970) is a Danish handball coach and former player, who is the current head coach of Neptunes de Nantes.

Previously she was head coach for FC Midtjylland Håndbold between 2012 and 2016, and the Swedish national team between 2014 and 2015 alongside Thomas Sivertsson. Between 2009 and 2012, she served as assistant coach to Niels Agesen in TTH Holstebro and assistant coach to Kenneth Jensen and Ryan Zinglersen in FC Midtjylland.

As a player, she won silver and bronze medals in the Danish handball championship. As a head coach, she has won the Danish championship twice, the Danish Handball Cup once and the EHF Cup once. In addition to that, she led FC Midtjylland to the Final Four tournament in the 2013–2014 Champions League season.

References

Danish handball coaches
Danish female handball players
1970 births
Living people
Danish expatriate sportspeople in the Netherlands
Danish expatriate sportspeople in Romania
Danish expatriate sportspeople in Sweden
Danish expatriate sportspeople in Norway
People from Frederikshavn
Handball coaches of international teams
Frederikshavn fI players
Sportspeople from the North Jutland Region